Mexican jumping beans (also known as  in Spanish) are seed pods that have been inhabited by the larva of a small moth (Cydia saltitans) and are native to Mexico. The "bean" is usually tan to brown.  They are from the shrub Sebastiania pavoniana, often also referred to as "jumping bean". However, they are not related to actual beans (legume plants), but rather to spurges. The beans are considered non-toxic but are not generally eaten. In the spring, when the shrub is flowering, moths lay their eggs on the shrub’s hanging seedpods. When the eggs hatch, tiny larvae bore into the immature green pods and begin to devour the seeds.  The pods ripen, fall to the ground and separate into three smaller segments, and those segments are called Mexican jumping beans. As the tiny larvae inside curl up and uncurl, they hit the capsule’s wall with their heads – and the bean jumps.  It’s been observed that they move more as temperatures rise, the larva eats away the inside of the bean (until it becomes hollow) and attaches itself to the inside of the bean with silk-like thread.

Physicists at Seattle University theorize, using Brownian motion as a model, that the larvae's random walk helps to find shade to survive on hot days. Although it does not optimize for finding shade quickly, the strategy minimizes the chances of never finding shade when shade is sparse.

The larva may live for months inside the bean with varying periods of dormancy. If the larva has adequate conditions of moisture and temperature, it will live long enough to go into a pupal stage. In the spring, the moth forces itself out of the bean through a round "trap door", leaving behind the pupal casing. After its metamorphosis, the small, silver and gray-colored moth lives for no more than a few days.

As a novelty

When the bean is warmed (by being held in the palm of the hand, for example) the larva will move to eat, pulling on the threads and causing the characteristic hop. Leaving the beans in a heated environment such as direct sunlight can kill the larva.

Care and storage
Beans should be stored in a cool, dry place.

Beans require periodic rehydration, mimicking the monsoon weather of their native Mexico. To rehydrate the beans, they need to be soaked, but not submerged, for about three hours in chlorine-free water once or twice a month.

Sources
The Mexican jumping bean comes from the mountains in the states of Sonora, Sinaloa, and Chihuahua. Álamos, Sonora, calls itself the "Jumping Bean Capital of the World". They can be found in an area approximately 30 by 100 miles where the Sebastiania pavoniana host tree grows. During the spring, moths emerge from last year's beans and deposit their eggs on the flower of the host tree.

See also
 Spirostachys africana, a related plant parasitized by a similar moth
 Emporia melanobasis, the moth parasite of Spirostachys africana
 Sea-Monkeys
 Formicarium
 Mighty Beanz, a plastic toy line in which the toys resemble Mexican jumping beans

References

Grapholitini
Articles containing video clips
Running gags
Novelty items
Mexican culture
Hippomaneae